Carex paui is a rare species of sedge (family Cyperaceae), with a western Mediterranean distribution; Morocco, Algeria, Tunisia, Spain, (including the Balearic Islands), and Italy (Elba and Sicily). Some authorities considered it a synonym of Carex laxula, but as that name was not validly published, Carex paui was the next available name.

References

paui
Flora of Morocco
Flora of Algeria
Flora of Tunisia
Flora of Spain
Flora of the Balearic Islands
Flora of Italy
Flora of Sicily
Plants described in 1925